Heringia vitripennis is a Palearctic species of hoverfly.

Description
External images
For terms see Morphology of DipteraLateral dust spots on frons conspicuous. 3rd antennomere (basoflagellomere) elongate, 2-3 times as long as broad. Male coxa 2 and trochanter 3 without spurs. Abdomen tergites black. Abdomen elongated.  1 with a shiny, pale pit;  2 without keel. Thorax dorsum with long white hairs. Face mostly black-haired. The male genitalia are figured by Delucchi and Pschorn-Walcher (1955). Delucchi et al (1957) figure the larva.
See references for determination

Biology
A woodland species (conifer forest and plantation, deciduous forest (Quercus, 
Carpinus, Ulmus), suburban parks and gardens. Arboreal but visits flowers of white umbellifers, Euphorbia, Potentilla, Prunus serotina, Rosa, Rubus fruticosus and Salix. The larvae are predacious on adelgid aphids. The flight period is May to September.

Distribution
Palearctic Southern Sweden to central France. Ireland eastwards through North Europe and Central Europe into Russia and on to the Russian Far East and Siberia to the Pacific coast.

References

Diptera of Europe
Pipizinae
Insects described in 1822
Taxa named by Johann Wilhelm Meigen